Qaralar (also, Karalylar) is a village and municipality in the Shamkir Rayon of Azerbaijan.  It has a population of 536.

Notable natives 

 Zaur Sariyev — National Hero of Azerbaijan.

References 

Populated places in Shamkir District